Augan is a commune in the Morbihan department in the  Brittany region in northwestern France.

Population
Inhabitants of Augan are called Alganais or Auganais.

See also
Communes of the Morbihan department

References

External links

Mayors of Morbihan Association 

Communes of Morbihan